Interstate 85 (I-85) is a part of the Interstate Highway System that runs from Montgomery, Alabama, to Petersburg, Virginia. In Alabama, the Interstate Highway runs  from I-65 in Montgomery northeast to the Georgia state line near Valley. I-85 is the primary highway between Montgomery and Atlanta. The Interstate also connects Montgomery with Tuskegee, Auburn, Opelika, and, indirectly, Phenix City and Columbus, Georgia.

Route description
I-85 begins at a six-ramp modified directional T interchange with I-65 southwest of downtown Montgomery. In addition to the ramps to and from I-65, the terminating Interstate's dual carriageways continue west a short distance and become Day Street; the interchange also includes a ramp from southbound I-65 to Day Street and from Day Street to northbound I-65. I-85 heads east toward downtown Montgomery as an eight-lane freeway. The highway has a pair of half diamond interchanges with Court Street (northbound exit, southbound entrance) and Union Street (southbound exit, northbound entrance). The one-way pair of Arba Street and South Street serve as frontage roads for the northbound and southbound lanes, respectively, along the southern edge of downtown. The interchanges provide access to the Alabama State Capitol and Alabama State University. Southeast of downtown Montgomery, I-85 has a pair of half interchanges with Forest Avenue (northbound exit, southbound entrance) and Mulberry Street (southbound exit, northbound entrance).

I-85 leaves the core of Montgomery and has a diamond interchange with Ann Street and a six-ramp partial cloverleaf interchange with Perry Hill Road. The freeway's next junction is with East Boulevard, which forms part of a circumferential highway around Montgomery; the partial cloverleaf interchange includes a flyover ramp from northbound East Boulevard to southbound I-85. East Boulevard carries US Route 231 (US 231) and State Route 21 (SR 21) through the interchange and US 80 south from the interchange; US 80 joins I-85 heading east from Montgomery. I-85's interchange with SR 271 provides access to Auburn University at Montgomery. The Interstate drops to four lanes between SR 271 and the next interchange with SR 110 and SR 126 (Atlanta Highway), where the route leaves the city of Montgomery.

I-85 and US 80 parallel SR 126 east through the community of Mount Meigs and through an unused directional T interchange with SR 108, which is also future I-85. This is among the largest and tallest interchanges in the state, featuring SR 126 and SR 293 on both sides of the Interstate and freeway state route. US 80 splits east onto Atlanta Highway at a diamond interchange, and I-85 heads east-northeast, leaving Montgomery County and entering Macon County at Line Creek. Another access to US 80 is provided at Shorter via an interchange with unsigned SR 138. The Interstate meets the southern end of SR 229 south of SR 229's crossing of the Tallapoosa River and the southern end of SR 49 near the town of Franklin. I-85's interchange with SR 81 connects the freeway with the Macon County seat of Tuskegee and Tuskegee University. The Interstate's final access to US 80 is via SR 186 (Wire Road), beyond which the freeway passes through a portion of the Tuskegee National Forest.

I-85 continues northeast into Lee County. On the southern edge of Auburn, the freeway has an interchange with Auburn Technology Parkway. US 29 joins I-85 at its next interchange with College Street; SR 147 continues north along College Street toward Auburn University. I-85 and US 29 continue northeast through the city to an interchange with Bent Creek Road, which provides access to Auburn University Regional Airport. The freeway continues northeast into the city of Opelika, the county seat of Lee County. I-85 gains a second US Route concurrency at its four-ramp partial cloverleaf interchange with Gateway Drive, where US 280 joins from the north. The three highways cross over a Norfolk Southern Railway line just west of their four-ramp partial cloverleaf interchange with SR 51 and SR 169 south of downtown Opelika.

US 280 splits east toward Phenix City and Columbus at the next interchange with US 431. US 29 diverges from I-85 at the following interchange, and the Interstate leaves the city of Opelika beyond its junction with Andrews Road. The Interstate enters Chambers County at its interchange with County Road 388 (CR 388), which leads to Cusseta. I-85 meets CR 208 in the unincorporated area of Huguley west of the city of Valley. Southbound I-85 has a welcome center between CR 208 and the freeway's final interchange in Alabama, a junction with US 29 between the cities of Valley to the south and Lanett to the north. I-85 crosses the Chattahoochee River on its way toward LaGrange and Atlanta.

History

The construction of the downtown part of the interstate in Montgomery destroyed a significant part of the traditionally African-American community in that area.

Future
An extension of I-85 is proposed west from Montgomery to interchange with I-20 and I-59 just east of the Mississippi–Alabama state line, where it will connect with I-20 and I-59 near Cuba. This extension will roughly follow the route of US 80, going through or bypassing Selma and Demopolis. The Federal Highway Administration (FHWA) approved the alignment on February 17, 2011, after the American Association of State Highway and Transportation Officials (AASHTO) approved at its Fall 2010 meeting in Biloxi, Mississippi. Also approved was the proposal to redesignate part of existing I-85 south and east of Montgomery to be bypassed as part of the extension of I-85 as I-685. I-85 will be rerouted onto the Montgomery Outer Loop, which will loop to the south and east of Montgomery and link up with US 80 west of Montgomery. Alabama has permission to cosign this part of I-85 as I-685 until the new alignment is built. This section has also envisioned by some as part of a proposed I-14. The first segment of the Montgomery Outer Loop from Vaughn Road (SR 110) to I-85 opened to traffic on January 25, 2016, signed as SR 108.

If this extension were to be completed, I-85 and I-20 would meet each other twice, and the extension of I-85 would run east–west.

Exit list

See also

References

External links

 

Transportation in Montgomery County, Alabama
Transportation in Macon County, Alabama
Transportation in Lee County, Alabama
Transportation in Chambers County, Alabama
 Alabama
85
Highways in Montgomery, Alabama
Auburn, Alabama
Auburn metropolitan area, Alabama